S53 may refer to:
 S53 (New York City bus), serving Staten Island
 Dhurga language, an Australian Aboriginal language
 S53: Avoid exposure - obtain special instructions before use, a safety phrase
 Shorland S53, a British armoured car
 Sikorsky S-53, an American helicopter
 Tsonga language, a Bantu language
 Saviem S53, a Saviem bus model
 Toyota S53, a Toyota S transmission